Property is the ownership of land, resources, improvements or other tangible objects, or intellectual property.

Property may also refer to:

Philosophy and science
 Property (philosophy), in philosophy and logic, an abstraction characterizing an object
Material properties, properties by which the benefits of one material versus another can be assessed
Chemical property, a material's properties that becomes evident during a chemical reaction
Physical property, any property that is measurable whose value describes a state of a physical system
Semantic property
Thermodynamic properties, in thermodynamics and materials science, intensive and extensive physical properties of substances
Mental property, a property of the mind studied by many sciences and parasciences

Computer science
 Property (programming), a type of class member in object-oriented programming
 .properties, a Java Properties File to store program settings as name-value pairs
 Window property, data associated to a window in the X Window System
 Property of a Resource Description Framework class, possessing a value domain and range
 Linear time property, a property that a computer system must satisfy

Law and politics
 Real property, a piece of land defined by boundaries to which ownership is usually ascribed, including any improvements on this land
 Property rights (economics), a discussion of the role of property in economic theory
National Register of Historic Places property types, a site designated and classified by its type on the U.S. National Register of Historic Places
 Personal property, property that is moveable

Other uses
Property (novel), a novel by Valerie Martin
Theatrical property (commonly "prop") a portable object seen on stage or film set